Jargon is the arcane vocabulary of a specific activity, profession or other ingroup.

Jargon may also refer to:
 The Jargon Society, an independent press founded by the American poet Jonathan Williams
 Jargon Software, a computer software development company

See also
 
 
 Jargoon, a type of zircon
 Jargon aphasia, a fluent or receptive aphasia in which the patient's speech is incomprehensible, but appears to make sense to them
 Jargon File, a glossary of computer programmer slang